William, Bill or Will Hays may refer to:

William Hays (general) (1819–1875), American Civil War Union general
William Hays (painter) (1872-1934), American painter
William B. Hays (1844–1912), Mayor of Pittsburgh, Pennsylvania
Will H. Hays (1879–1954), American movie censor
William Hercules Hays (1820–1880), U.S. federal judge
William Shakespeare Hays (1837–1907), American poet and lyricist
William Torrance Hays (1837–1875), Ontario political figure
Bill Hays (director) (1938–2006), British director of stage and television

See also
William Hayes (disambiguation)
William Hay (disambiguation)